Marc Porat is a tech entrepreneur and angel investor. He is founder of six companies including General Magic.  In the early 2000s, Porat was a member of a high-profile wave of tech executives who founded cleantech companies. He launched three companies in the built environment: Serious Materials, Zeta Communities, and CalStar Cement and was a member of the U.S. China Green Energy Council.

Early career 
Porat was educated at Columbia College, where he graduated in 1972.

He then continued his graduate studies at Stanford University and authored a pivotal work entitled The Information Economy as his doctoral thesis in which he predicted the transition from a manufacturing-based U.S. economy to one based on information. Porat is credited with first identifying the U.S. as an "information society." Later, his nephew Aaron Hurst defined and wrote about the "Purpose Economy" and credited Porat with the inspiration for predicting the rise of a new economy.

After Stanford, Porat worked for the U.S. Department of Commerce and then served as a program director at the Aspen Institute and was later appointed Executive Director, Washington Activities of the Aspen Institute Program on Communications and Society.  While at   Aspen, Porat produced the film The Information Society for PBS.

After leaving the Aspen Institute, Porat co-founded Private Satellite Network (PSN). The company was a direct broadcast satellite innovator that built and operated television and data networks for Fortune 500 companies and governments. The firm  pioneered the use of small aperture rooftop antennas for videoconferencing. The company was sold and Porat joined Apple Computer.

General Magic 
Porat co-founded General Magic in 1990 with Andy Hertzfeld and Bill Atkinson from the original Mac team. The company built an early handheld communications device called Magic Link. Referred to then as a “personal intelligent communicator,” it was the precursor to the smart phone PDA. The company also pioneered "intelligent agents."

Porat served as CEO from 1990 to 1996 and took the company public in 1995 at a valuation of $834M. The stock doubled on the first day.

The Built Environment 
In 2002, Porat co-founded Serious Materials, a company manufacturing high-efficiency windows and drywall. He then founded CalStar Products in 2007, a firm recovering energy from industrial waste streams. He  also co-founded Zeta Communities (ZETA) in 2007, a firm  designing and manufacturings net-zero energy multifamily housing that won the Green Builder Home of the Year Award.

Personal life 
Porat was born to Frieda and Dan Porat in Israel and grew up in England. He and his family moved to the United States, where his father worked at Harvard University and Stanford University's SLAC National Accelerator Laboratory. Porat's sister, Ruth Porat, is the current CFO of Google.

References

American chief executives of manufacturing companies
Businesspeople in information technology
Stanford University alumni
Living people
Year of birth missing (living people)
Columbia College (New York) alumni
American people of English-Jewish descent